Sudev Nair (born 14 April 1985) is an Indian actor and model working in Malayalam films best known for his performance in the 2014 film My Life Partner, for which he was awarded the Kerala State Film Award for Best Actor in 2014. He also starred in the 2019 Hindi film India's Most Wanted in the title role opposite Arjun Kapoor. 

His other works include the Hindi film Gulaab Gang (2014) and the Malayalam film Anarkali (2015). He also played a notable role in the film Karinkunnam 6'S.  He also played the title character in the film Ezra.
He is also well known for writing, directing and starring in India's first Mockumentary web series Not Fit (The Viral Fever and Dice Media) which won many international awards and was also featured at the MAMI in 2016.

Early life
Despite being placed in the routine campus placements after Engineering, his passion for cinema drove him towards his Post graduation at the Pune Film Institute. The inception of his film-making career began with various short films in various genres, which participated in competitions and festivals at National and International levels. His short ad for Mountain Dew soft drink was shortlisted to the finals at the MOFILM Barcelona Ad Film Fest in 2010.

Career
His acting career began with the Hindi film Gulaab Gang (2014), directed by Soumik Sen. Set with a plot on the struggle of Indian Women, Gulaab Gang had an ensemble star cast including Madhuri Dixit and Juhi Chawla. The movie was praised by critics garnering positive response for the acting performances. Sudev then went on to star in debutant M. B. Padmakumar's My Life Partner, which dealt with the emotional relationship between two men.  The movie became a controversy and faced issues with its release. Sudev played the role of Kiran, for which he went on to win the Kerala State Film Award for Best Actor 2014.

Sudev also appeared in Anarkali (2015).

Awards and recognition

Kerala State Film Award for Best Actor - My Life Partner''

Malanadu TV Best Actor in a Negative Role for Bheeshma Parvam

Filmography

Web series

References

External links

Living people
21st-century Indian male actors
1985 births
Male actors in Malayalam cinema
Indian male film actors
Kerala State Film Award winners
Male actors in Hindi cinema
Male actors from Mumbai